Vitis davidii is a species of vining plant native to Asia. The plant grows to a height of up to 8 m (25 ft) and bears small, black grapes. It is also known as the Chinese bramble grape.

References

External links
Vitis davidii (Bramble Grape)
International Plant Names Index: Vitis davidii
Global Biodiversity Information Facility: Vitis davidii
Plants of the World Online: Vitis davidii
Flora of China: Vitis davidii

davidii
Endemic flora of China
Plants described in 1886